The 2008 St Helens Metropolitan Borough Council election took place on 1 May 2008 to elect members of St Helens Metropolitan Borough Council in Merseyside, England. One third of the council was up for election and the council stayed under no overall control.

After the election, the composition of the council was
Labour 23
Liberal Democrats 19
Conservative 6

Background
At the last election in 2007, Labour remained the largest party with 21 seats, the Liberal Democrats has 20, Conservatives 6 and there was 1 independent. However soon after the election the independent councillor, Bessie Griffin, joined the Liberal Democrats. Since the 2006 election the Liberal Democrats and Conservative had run the council together, while Labour was in opposition.

16 seats were contested in 2008 and as well as candidates from Labour, Liberal Democrats and the Conservatives, there were 10 candidates from the British National Party.

Election result
Labour gained 2 seats to have 23 councillors, but fell 2 short of regaining a majority on the council, as the Liberal Democrats had 19 seats and the Conservatives 6. The Labour gains from the Liberal Democrats came in Billinge and Seneley Green and in West Park, while they held marginal seats in Haydock and Bold, with the result in Bold only coming after 3 recounts. The Labour gain in Billinge and Seneley Green meant the party regained the seat they had lost when councillor Bessie Griffin had left Labour to become an independent and then later joined the Liberal Democrats.

Following the election the Liberal Democrat and Conservative parties continued to run the council together, with Liberal Democrat Brian Spencer remaining leader of the council.

Ward results

By-elections between 2008 and 2010

Parr
A by-election took place in Parr on 12 March 2009 after the death of Labour councillor Ken Pinder. The seat was held for Labour by Andy Bowden with a majority of 340 votes over Liberal Democrat Barry Dodd.

Rainhill
A by-election took place in Rainhill on 12 March 2009 after the death of Labour councillor Mike Doyle. The seat was held for Labour by Barrie Grunewald with a majority of 503 votes over Liberal Democrat Denise Aspinall.

Moss Bank
A by-election was held in Moss Bank on 16 July 2009 after the death of Liberal Democrat councillor Anna Heyes. The seat was held for Liberal Democrats by David Kent with a majority of 469 votes over Labour's Jeffrey Fletcher.

References

2008 English local elections
2008
2000s in Merseyside